Shihan . Born in Osaka, Matsuoka was first introduced to martial arts through judo as part of his required physical education curriculum in high school. His father, Shiro Matsuoka, then enrolled Haruo in a summer camp where he would witness his first aikido demonstration.

Returning home from summer camp, Haruo began taking aikido classes at a local dojo, but his teacher wasn't very good. In 1975, Steven Seagal began teaching aikido in Japan with his then wife, Miyako Fujitani, the daughter of an aikido sensei and 2nd dan aikidoka herself, at her father's dojo.

Matsuoka would remark to Black Belt Magazine in 2014, “When I first met Seagal sensei, his Japanese wasn't so fluent, but his technique was remarkable — unlike what I'd seen before. He was so fast, very fluid. Seeing him doing aikido changed my life." Matsuoka signed up on the spot.

By 1978, Matsuoka had earned his black belt ranking and began teaching classes in Japan with Seagal & Fujitani. In 1983, he would follow Seagal to Los Angeles to open their first dojo. The first years were difficult as Americans didn't understand what aikido was or had any concept what its benefits were, but that changed when Seagal's "Above the Law" was released in 1988, showcasing his modern style of aikido for a wider audience, creating a resurgence in popularity for aikido around the world.

Matsuoka continued to serve as chief instructor at Seagal's dojo while Seagal's career took off, eventually leaving in 1997 to return to Japan and the roots of aikido he felt had diverged with Seagal. He would seek out Seiseki Abe, one of aikido founder Morihei Ueshiba's most revered students and also Ueshiba's teacher in Japanese calligraphy.

Matsuoka would receive his 5th dan ranking from Abe and return to Los Angeles in 1999 to continue his mission of promoting Japanese culture through aikido, opening dojos in Culver City and Irvine. Matsuoka then founded the Aikido Doshinokai Association to tie together the many adherents of his particular style combining the original fluidity taught by Ueshiba with the harder style of Seagal.

Matsuoka continues to seek further mastery in aikido, receiving his 6th dan from Moriteru Ueshiba, Morihei's grandson and current Doshu (hereditary head) of the aikikai in 2012, and formally recognized as shihan by the Aikikai Foundation in 2020. He has participated in exchange programs with martial arts masters of other disciplines such as Dan Inosanto (disciple of Bruce Lee), and Kenji Yamaki (1995 Kyokushin Karate World Champion), and continues to teach, participating in regular seminars for students around the world in Belgium, France, Poland, Spain, Italy, as well as at his own schools in Los Angeles.

References

1958 births

Living people

Japanese aikidoka

Shihan
Stunt performers
People from Osaka